Keith Williams,  (22 September 1929 – 19 October 2011) was an Australian entrepreneur who developed some of the best known  attractions in Queensland, including Sea World, Hamilton Island and Port Hinchinbrook.

Williams was a self-made multimillionaire who began his career in the 1960s with the creation of a water skiing park in Surfers Paradise. This was followed by a raceway, Sea World, and Hamilton Island, Daydream Island and Port Hinchinbrook in the Whitsunday Islands.

Williams earned a reputation as both a visionary and a pioneer, and as the bane of environmentalists.

He was born in Brisbane on 22 September 1929. He left school aged 13 and by aged 16 had started his first business. By 19, he was making products licensed by Walt Disney in a self-built factory at Bulimba with 50 employees. By age 30 Williams was an Australian water-skiing champion and in 1963 married a former TV star and later Miss Gold Coast, Thea Williams.

References

1929 births
2011 deaths
Australian businesspeople
Businesspeople from Queensland
Australian Companions of the Order of St Michael and St George